These people have been born, died or have spent time in Gilan province, Iran as residence.
Abdul-Qadir Gilani, 12th century founder of the Qadiri order of Sunni Islam
Mohammad Ali Mojtahedi Gilani
Ardeshir Mohassess
Mirza Kuchek Khan
Arsen Minasian
Hazin Lahiji
Mirza Kouchak Khan Jangali, Soviet Republic of Gilan 1920-1921
Mohammad Taghi Bahjat Foumani
Al-Jilani
Mahmoud Behzad
Majid Samii
Pejman Nouri
Mohammad Moin
Sirous Ghayeghran
Ghafour Jahani
Hushang Ebtehaj
Mardavij
Shams Langeroodi
Ebrahim Nabavi
Roozbeh Mirebrahimi
Fazlollah Reza
Enayatollah Reza
Akbar Radi
Hooshang Amirahmadi

People from Gilan Province
Gilan